Richard Pendleton Balderson (born February 7, 1946 in Newport News, Virginia) is a retired American professional baseball player, front-office executive and scout. A longtime scouting and player development director, Balderson was the general manager of the Seattle Mariners of Major League Baseball from late October 1985 through late July 1988.

Playing career
Balderson was a minor league relief pitcher in his playing days. He graduated from the University of Richmond, where he starred in baseball and played varsity basketball, and signed with the Kansas City Royals' organization in 1968, one year before the expansion team played its first MLB game. His active career lasted for eight years (1968–1975), all with the Royals. Although he never reached Triple-A, 163 of his 234 games played were at the Double-A level. His career won–lost record was 32–21.

Executive career
In 1977, Balderson moved into the Royals' front office as assistant farm system director. In , he became Kansas City's director of scouting and player development and one of general manager John Schuerholz' top aides. The Royals were then a power in the American League West Division. In , they won the American League pennant and the World Series. Their success led George Argyros, owner of the sixth-place Seattle Mariners, to select Balderson as his next general manager. He held the position through July 26, 1988. During his term, the team drafted future Baseball Hall of Famer Ken Griffey Jr. with the first overall selection in the 1987 Major League Baseball Draft. Balderson also made one of the best trades in franchise history, when he acquired Jay Buhner from the New York Yankees for Ken Phelps on July 21, 1988. But the Mariners continued to struggle in the AL West standings during Balderson's tenure.

Balderson remained in the game as a senior scouting and player development executive for the next 25 years. He was the scouting director of the Chicago Cubs in – and their director of player development in –. He moved to the expansion Colorado Rockies as director of player development from – and then joined the Atlanta Braves as a special-assignment scout, reuniting him with Baseball Hall of Fame executive Schuerholz. Balderson spent the rest of his career with the Braves. He worked as their farm system and scouting director from –, then returned to scouting and later became a special assistant to Frank Wren, Schuerholz' successor as general manager. He retired in 2013.

Balderson was elected to the University of Richmond's Athletics Hall of Fame in 1994.

References

External links

Baseball America.com

1946 births
Living people
Atlanta Braves executives
Atlanta Braves scouts
Baseball executives
Baseball players from Virginia
Chicago Cubs executives
Colorado Rockies executives
Corning Royals players
Elmira Pioneers players
High Point-Thomasville Royals players
Jacksonville Suns players
Kansas City Royals executives
Major League Baseball farm directors
Major League Baseball general managers
Major League Baseball scouting directors
Richmond Spiders baseball players
Richmond Spiders men's basketball players
San Jose Bees players
Seattle Mariners executives
Sportspeople from Newport News, Virginia
University of Richmond alumni
Waterloo Royals players